Sir Henry Neville (baptised 20 May 1564 – 10 July 1615) was an English courtier, politician and diplomat, noted for his role as ambassador to France and his unsuccessful attempts to negotiate between James I of England and the Houses of Parliament. In 2005, Neville was put forward as a candidate for the authorship of Shakespeare's works.

Family
Neville was the elder son of Sir Henry Neville (died 1593) and his second wife, Elizabeth Gresham (died 6 November 1573), granddaughter of Sir Richard Gresham, Lord Mayor of London, and only daughter and heir of the latter's elder son, John Gresham (died 1560), by Frances Thwaytes, the daughter and coheir of Sir Henry Thwaytes of Lund, Yorkshire.

Neville's father had earlier married, between 1551 and 1555, Winifred Losse (died in or before 1561), daughter of a property speculator, Hugh Losse (died 1555) of Whitchurch, London, by whom he had no children.

After the death of his second wife, Neville's father married thirdly, about May 1578, Elizabeth Bacon (c. 1541 – 3 May 1621), widow of Sir Robert Doyley (died between 21 and 29 July 1577) of Chislehampton, Oxfordshire, and Greenlands in Hambleden, Buckinghamshire. Elizabeth Bacon was the eldest daughter of Queen Elizabeth's Lord Keeper of the Great Seal, Sir Nicholas Bacon (1510–1579), by his first wife, Jane Ferneley (died 1552), the daughter of William Ferneley of Suffolk. After Neville's death, his widow, Elizabeth, married, before the end of September 1595, Sir William Peryam (died 9 October 1604). She made her last will on 12 November 1618 and died on 3 May 1621. There is a monument to her in the church of St Mary's Henley-on-Thames.

Neville's father was a great-great-grandson of Ralph Neville, 1st Earl of Westmorland and Joan Beaufort, Countess of Westmoreland, the daughter of John of Gaunt, 1st Duke of Lancaster, by Katherine Swynford.

Career

Neville grew up at Billingbear House at Waltham St Lawrence in Berkshire. At the age of fifteen, he matriculated from Merton College, Oxford, on 20 December 1577. His tutor was Henry Savile, later warden of Merton. In 1578 Neville accompanied Savile on a continental tour, visiting Padua, Venice, and Prague.

Neville sat in Parliament as the member for New Windsor (1584, 1586 and 1593), Sussex (1589), Liskeard (1597) and Berkshire (1604, 1614). He served as High Sheriff of Berkshire in 1595. Before his father's death, he lived at the old Archbishop's Palace at Mayfield in Sussex, inherited from his great-uncle Sir Thomas Gresham (died 1579), where he ran a highly successful cannon manufactury. He was appointed Deputy Lieutenant of Berkshire in 1596 and moved to Billingbear the next year. He was knighted in 1599.

In 1599, Neville was appointed Ambassador to France and attended the court of Henri IV. Although knighted for his services in France, he was unhappy with the way he was treated by the French and in 1600, complaining of deafness, he asked to be recalled to England.

After his return he became involved with the Essex Rebellion of 1601 and was imprisoned in the Tower of London. His close friend Henry Wriothesley, 3rd Earl of Southampton, was also imprisoned there at this time in connection with the plot.

He was stripped of his position and fined £5,000, which he agreed to pay in annual instalments of £1,000. After the death of Elizabeth I of England and the accession of James I a Royal Warrant was issued for his release.

After his release, he played a greater role in the political life of the nation, but earned the antagonism of King James by advocating the King surrender to the demands of the House of Commons.

In the first session of 1610, and again in 1612, he advised the king to give way to the demands of the House of Commons. It was these actions that, on the death of Robert Cecil, 1st Earl of Salisbury, in May 1612, lost him the possibility of becoming the Secretary of State. Although offered the position of Treasurer of the Chamber he turned it down.

Neville died in 1615 and was buried at the church of St Lawrence in Waltham St Lawrence.

Shakespeare authorship

In 2005, Neville was proposed as the actual author of Shakespeare's works. The attribution is rejected by almost all academic Shakespeareans who have responded to the claim.

Marriage and issue
In December 1584, Neville married Anne Killigrew (died 1632), the daughter of Sir Henry Killigrew (died 1603) and Catherine Cooke, sister-in-law of William Cecil, 1st Baron Burghley, by whom he had five sons and six daughters:
 Sir Henry Neville (II), 1588–29 June 1629, married Elizabeth Smyth; among his children were Richard Neville (soldier) and Henry Neville.
 Catherine Neville, c. 1590–1650, married Sir Richard Brooke.
 Frances Neville, 1592–1659, married Sir Richard Worsley, 1st Baronet then Jerome Brett.
 Mary Neville, NK – 28 October 1642, married Sir Edward Lewknor.
 William Neville, 1596–1640, second son,  married Catherine Billingley, issue unknown.
 Edward Neville, 1602–1632, married Alice Pryor, issue.
 Robert Neville, 1604-NK 
 Dorothy Neville, 1605–1673, married Richard Catlin.
 Charles Neville, 1607–1626, probably unmarried.
 Richard Neville, 1608–1644, married unknown, issue.
 Elizabeth Neville, NK – 4 January 1657, married William Glover, then Sir Henry Berkeley, then Thomas Duke.
 Anne Neville, 1610-NK.

Notes

References

External links 
Henry Neville - History of Parliament Online
Henry Neville - Dictionary of National Biography
Elizabeth Bacon (d. 1621), A Who’s Who of Tudor Women: B-Bl. Retrieved 25 March 2013
Bacon, Sir Nicholas (1510–1579), History of Parliament. Retrieved 25 March 2013
 Tudor Place Bios Sir Henry Neville of Billingbere

1564 births
1615 deaths
Alumni of Merton College, Oxford
16th-century English diplomats
Ambassadors of England to France
English rebels
People from Waltham St Lawrence
Henry
High Sheriffs of Berkshire
British businesspeople in the armaments industry
Prisoners in the Tower of London
Deputy Lieutenants of Berkshire
Knights Bachelor
English knights
English MPs 1584–1585
English MPs 1586–1587
English MPs 1589
English MPs 1593
English MPs 1604–1611
English MPs 1614
Members of the Parliament of England (pre-1707) for New Windsor
Members of Parliament for Sussex
Members of the Parliament of England (pre-1707) for Liskeard
Members of the Parliament of England for Berkshire
People from Mayfield, East Sussex